Sala or SALA may refer to:

Places

Europe
 Sala, the historical name of the river IJssel and home of the Salii Franks
 Sala (Estonian island), one of the Uhtju islands
 Sala Baganza, a municipality in Emilia-Romagna, Italy
 Sala Bolognese, a municipality in Emilia-Romagna, Italy
 Sala Consilina, a municipality in Campania, Italy
 Sala Municipality, Latvia, a municipality in Latvia
 Sala, Sala Parish, a village in Latvia, an administrative centre of Sala municipality
 Šaľa, Slovakia, a city in Slovakia
 Sala Municipality, Sweden, a municipality in Sweden
 Sala, Sweden, a city in Sweden, seat of Sala Municipality
 Sala Parish (disambiguation), parishes (socken) in Sweden

Africa
 Salé, Morocco
 Sala, an ancient city at Rabat, Morocco
 Sala, Houet, a village in Satiri Department, Houet Province, Burkina Faso
 Sala, Ziro, a village in Ziro Province, Burkina Faso
 Sala Colonia, a Phoenician and Roman colony whose ruins are located in present-day Chellah, Morocco
 Sala River, the Roman name for the Bou Regreg

Asia
 Şələ, Azerbaijan
 Sala, Cambodia, village in Cambodia
 Sala, Iran, village in Kurdistan Province, Iran
 Sala, Cabuyao, barangay in the Philippines
 Sala, Lampang, village and sub district in northern Thailand
 Sala (Lydia), ancient town of Lydia, now in modern Turkey

Buildings
 Śālā, any hall, house, shed or covered space in Indian architecture; also a school (salai, calai)
 Sala (Thai architecture), an open pavilion in the architecture of Thailand
 Sala Polivalentă (disambiguation)
 Sala Regia (disambiguation)
 Sala Stadium, stadium in Ashkelon, Israel
 Šaľa Stadium, stadium in Šaľa, Slovakia

Other
 Sala (name), a given name and surname
 South Australian Living Artists Festival, visual arts festival known as SALA
 Sal tree (Pali and Sanskrit "sāla")
 Salak (Salacca zalacca, translated from Thai as "sala"), a tree and its fruit, native to southeast Asia

See also
 I-sala, a type of Fijian headscarf or turban
 
 Salat, alternative spelling
 Saila, name
 Salar people, an ethnic group from China
 Salas (disambiguation)